Vermilyea Lake is a lake in the Hayes River drainage basin in Census Division No. 22 - Thompson-North Central, Northern Region, Manitoba, Canada. The primary inflow is a channel from Touchwood Lake, and the primary outflows are the twin channels of the Wesachewan River to Gods Lake. The lake's waters eventually flow via the Gods River and the Hayes River into Hudson Bay.

References

Lakes of Manitoba